PFET may refer to:
 p-channel FET (Field-effect transistor)
 PMOS logic
 p-channel MOSFET (metal–oxide–semiconductor field-effect transistor)